Pt Joi Srivastava was a well-known North Indian violinist of the Senia Gharana.

Early life and training 
Joi Srivastava was born in Allahabad on 1 January 1930. He learned Hindustani classical violin from Gagan Chandra Chatterjee, a violinist who is credited with introducing the gat-style of violin playing in North India. After his teacher died, Joi Srivastava learnt from the celebrated Ustad Alauddin Khan as well for a few years.

Career 
He was a prodigy who became a master of the instrument even before he turned 20. He started teaching at the University of Allahabad and also at Kala Bharati Allahabad. Around 1957 he moved to Delhi and joined the All India Radio where he was a regular artiste till his retirement in 1987. After that he taught violin at the Gandharva Mahavidyalaya, Delhi till 1994.

Music for documentaries
 Saarang - the Peacock  (features Raag Megh and Raag Vrindavani Saarang played by him on the violin)
 Lime Buildings Breathe (features Raag Dhani, Raag Sindhu Bhairavi and Raag Yamani Bilawal played by him on the violin)

Style 
Joi Srivastava pioneered a unique style of playing North Indian Classical music on the violin. He was the most accomplished student of Gagan Chandra Chatterjee and could play the full range of music hitherto possible on sitar and sarod only. He also went further and imbibed techniques of Carnatic Veena and Western classical as well into his playing.

Family
 Joi Srivastava was married to Sushil Srivastava
 Joi Srivastava has three children
 DR.Gunjan.S.Bhatnagar (eldest daughter)
 Seema Madhusudan(second born daughter)
 Bharat Srivastava (youngest son)
 Joi Srivastava has three grandchildren
 Mansa Madhusudan (daughter of Madhusudan and Seema Madhusudan)
 Mandira Bhatnagar (daughter of Gunjan Bhatnagar and Rajendra Kumar Bhatnagar)
 Arpit Bhatnagar(son of Gunjan Bhatnagar and Rajendra Kumar Bhatnagar)

Students 
Joi Srivastava was a teacher to many violinists of North India, and also of other countries:
 Kumar Dinesh Deo  
 Prakash Narayan of Allahabad 
 Guruprasad Sharma of Allahabad
 Patti Weiss
 Anne Marie Ene
 Lenneke van Staalen  
 Sharat Chandra Srivastava is his grandson and the leading performer in his style  
 Satyanarayan Sharma of Jaipur
 Harvinder Singh (sitar)
 Darshan Singh Sur of Greater Noida,Uttar Pradesh.
 Janardhan Prasad Mishra, Sangeet Samiti, Allahabad.

References

External links 
 Article in The Hindu on his 80th birth anniversary
 
 

1930 births
2003 deaths
Hindustani instrumentalists
Hindustani violinists
Indian violinists
20th-century violinists
20th-century Indian musicians